This is a list of members of the Western Australian Legislative Assembly between the 1921 election and the 1924 election, together known as the 11th Parliament. During the term, the Country Party split into rival factions, the Ministerial Country Party (MCP) which comprised the bulk of the parliamentary party—many of whom had switched allegiance from other parties since 1919—and the Executive Country Party (ECP), which was loyal to the Primary Producers' Association, which the Country Party was intended to represent in Parliament. After the 1924 election, which significantly strengthened the latter at the expense of the former, the Ministerial arm merged with the Nationalist Party.

Notes
 On 13 April 1921, Henry Kennedy Maley, member for Greenough, was appointed by Premier Sir James Mitchell as Minister for Agriculture. Maley was therefore required to resign and contest a ministerial by-election, at which he was returned unopposed on 14 May 1921.
 On 22 August 1922, Richard Sampson, member for Swan, was appointed by Premier Sir James Mitchell as Colonial Secretary and Minister for Public Health. Sampson was therefore required to resign and contest a ministerial by-election, at which he was returned unopposed on 31 August 1922.
 On 1 November 1922, the Nationalist (formerly Labor) member for East Perth, J. J. Simons, resigned. He subsequently nominated as a candidate for the resulting by-election on 18 November 1922, but was defeated by the Labor candidate, Thomas Hughes.
 On 14 December 1922, the Independent member for Kalgoorlie, John Boyland, died. Labor candidate James Cunningham won the resulting by-election on 13 January 1923.
 On 12 November 1923, the Labor member for Forrest, Peter O'Loghlen, died. The Labor candidate, long-serving former Murchison MLA John Holman, won the resulting by-election on 8 December 1923.

Sources
 
 

Members of Western Australian parliaments by term